21 Jump Street is an American police procedural crime drama television series that aired on the Fox Network and in first run syndication from April 12, 1987, to April 27, 1991, with a total of 103 episodes. The series focuses on a squad of youthful-looking undercover police officers investigating crimes in high schools, colleges, and other teenage venues.

Series overview

Episodes

Season 1 (1987)

Season 2 (1987–88)

Season 3 (1988–89)

Season 4 (1989–90)

Season 5 (1990–91)

References

External links

episodes
Lists of American crime drama television series episodes